Parenchelyurus is a genus of combtooth blennies found in the Pacific, and Indian oceans.

Species
There are currently two recognized species in this genus:
 Parenchelyurus hepburni (Snyder, 1908) (Hepburn's blenny)
 Parenchelyurus hyena (Whitley, 1953)

References

 
Blenniinae
Marine fish genera
Taxa named by Victor G. Springer